Calderón is a Spanish and Sefardi occupational surname. It is derived from the Vulgar Latin "caldaria" ("cauldron") and refers to the occupation of tinker.

Calderón, or Calderon, may refer to:

 Alberto Calderón, Argentine mathematician
 Alfonso Calderon (activist), Spanish born activist and advocate for gun control
 Alfonso Calderón (poet), Chilean poet and writer
 Bernardo Calderón Cabrera, Mexican architect
 Charles Calderon (born 1950), California lawyer and politician, brother of Ron
 Cleofé Calderón, Argentine botanist
 Diego de Landa Calderón, an early Bishop in the Yucatán
 Felipe Calderón, President of Mexico
 Felipe G. Calderón, Filipino constitutionalist
 Francisco García Calderón, President of Peru in 1881
 Francisco García Calderón Rey, Peruvian writer and diplomat, representative at the Evian Conference in 1938
 Harold Calderon, American boxer
 Iñigo Calderón, Spanish footballer playing at Brighton & Hove Albion
 Iván Calderón (boxer), Puerto Rican boxer
 Iván Calderón (baseball), Puerto Rican baseball player
 Jorge Calderón, long-time musical collaborator with Warren Zevon
 José Calderón (basketball), Spanish basketball player
 José Luis Calderón, Argentine footballer
 José Luis Calderón Cabrera, Mexican architect
 José Manuel Calderón (musician), Dominican singer, songwriter and musician
 Juan Manuel Santos Calderón, President of Colombia
 María Calderón, Spanish actor
 Mercedes Calderón, Cuban volleyball player
 Paco Calderón, Mexican political cartoonist
 Paul Calderón, American actor
 Pedro Calderón de la Barca, Spanish dramatist
 Philip Hermogenes Calderon, British painter of Spanish origin
 Rafael Ángel Calderón Guardia, president of Costa Rica from 1940 to 1944
 Rafael Ángel Calderón Fournier, president of Costa Rica from 1990 to 1994; son of the above
 Ramón Calderón, former Real Madrid president
 Ron Calderon (born 1957), California politician, brother of Charles
 Ruth Calderon (born 1961), Israeli scholar and politician
 Serafín Estébanez Calderón, Spanish author (1799–1867)
 Sila María Calderón, Governor of the Commonwealth of Puerto Rico (2000–2004)
 Tatiana Calderón, Colombian racing driver
 Tego Calderón, Puerto Rican rapper
 Vicente Calderón, former Atlético Madrid president
 Wilmer Calderon, (born 1975) Puerto Rican-American actor

See also
 Calderone

References

External links
 Calderón Ancestry webpage
 Facebook: The Calderón Ancestry Group

Spanish-language surnames
Occupational surnames